The winner of the first season of The Voice of Nepal was CD Vijaya Adhikari from Team Deep. The runner-ups were Shrijay Thapaliya, Kushal Acharya and Saptak Durtraj from Team Pramod, Team Sanup and Team Aabhaya respectively. The finale of the season one was held in Qatar, on December 14, 2018.

The audition for the show (season 1) was taken using The Voice of Nepal app for iOS and Android. In total, 12,000 digital clips were received within 30 days, and it took 20 more days to select 108 participants, among whom, some of them are Non Resident Nepali from Japan, Australia, Dubai, and India.

The first episode was broadcast on Kantipur TV and on Ramailo HD on 25 August 2018. The show times are every Saturday and Sunday 9:00 pm (NPT) onward.

Teams

Blind auditions

Episode 1 (August 25) 
Color key

Episode 2 (August 26)

Episode 3 (September 1)

Episode 4 (September 2)

Episode 5 (September 8)

Episode 6 (September 9)

Episode 7 (September 15)

Episode 8 (September 16)

Episode 9 (September 22)

Episode 10 (September 23)

Coaches' teams
 Winning coach; winners are denoted by boldface.

The Battles 

Color key:

Coaches teams after Battle Round.  (Stolen artists at the bottom).

Live shows
The live shows will begin on 27 October 2018.

Results summary
Result's colour key
 Artist received the fewest votes and was eliminated 
 Artist was saved by coach
 Artist won the public vote
 Winner
 Runner-up
 Artist did not perform that week

Week 1: (27–28 October)
This episode aired from 8:30 pm to 10:30pm.

Week 2: (3–4 November)

Week 3: (10–11 November)

Week 4: (17–18 November)

Week 5: (24–25 November)

Week 6: (1–2 December)

Semi finals

Week 7: (8–9 December)

Finale

References 

Nepal
2018 Nepalese television seasons